Admiral Sir Claud Barrington Barry  (17 July 1891 – 27 December 1951) was a Royal Navy officer who became Naval Secretary.

Naval service
Educated at Cordwalles School and at the Royal Naval College, Osborne, and the Royal Naval College, Dartmouth, Barry joined the Royal Navy in 1904 and served in World War I in the Submarine Service commanding various submarines including HMS C20, HMS C21, HMS D6 and HMS R12. After the War he served with the Royal Australian Navy and was then given command of HMS K22 followed by HMS K26 before being appointed Chief of Staff to the Admiral, Submarines in 1934.

He also served in World War II as Naval Assistant to the Second Sea Lord and as Captain of the battleship HMS Queen Elizabeth before becoming Rear-Admiral, Submarines in 1942. After the War he became Naval Secretary and then Director of Dockyards from 1946 to 1951.

References

External links

|-

1891 births
1951 deaths
Royal Navy admirals of World War II
Knights Commander of the Order of the British Empire
Companions of the Order of the Bath
Companions of the Distinguished Service Order
People educated at the Royal Naval College, Osborne